The Red Bridge is located just northeast of Monroe, Iowa, United States.  The  span carried traffic on County Road S74 over the South Skunk River.  This is one of the few Warren truss bridges built in Iowa in the 19th century.  Local bridge contractor H.S. Efnor built the main span for $3,515.34 in 1892.  It received considerable damage in a 1947 flood, and the county replaced one of its steel cylinder piers with a concrete pier, and added the pony truss approach span on the north side.   It has subsequently been closed to traffic.  The bridge was listed on the National Register of Historic Places in 1998.

References

Bridges completed in 1892
Truss bridges in Iowa
Transportation buildings and structures in Jasper County, Iowa
Road bridges on the National Register of Historic Places in Iowa
National Register of Historic Places in Jasper County, Iowa
Steel bridges in the United States
Warren truss bridges in the United States